The Federal University Dutse (FUD), is one of the nine universities created by the Federal Government of Nigeria in 2011.

FUD offers both undergraduate and postgraduate programs (Pgde.Msc. and as well as PhD.)

The Federal University, Dutse (FUD) held its first convocation ceremony on January 16, 2016.

Delivering his speech at the convocation ceremony the Pioneer vice chancellor of the university Professor Jibirilla Dahiru Aminu (OFR) revealed that the university has scored over 80 percent marks from the assessment made by National Council of university on facilities and academic effectiveness.
Delivering his speech at the convocation ceremony the Pioneer vice chancellor of the university Professor Jibirilla Dahiru Aminu (OFR) revealed that the university has scored over 80 percent marks from the assessment made by National Council of University on facilities and academic effectiveness.
The university's campus is located in the ancient town of Dutse the capital of Jigawa State.  FUD seeks to attract a diverse cast of lecturers and students, support research and teaching on local, national and global issues and create academic relationships with many universities and higher education institutions in Nigeria and across the world.  FUD is offering a broad range of degree programs in Humanities, Natural and the Social Sciences,  Agricultural Science and also in Medicine. Faculties in offerings are Faculty of law, faculty of engineering and faculty of management science to take up this year.
From the university's pioneer crop of 205 students enrolled in four academic programmes in three faculties had grown to about 3,200 students in the university's fifth academic year of operation, while there are 1,332 academic
and non-teaching staff. The number courses in the university now
stand at 17.

University Library 
The main Library is located at the central campus with seven divisions that is headed by a University Librarian.  Each division has information resources that meet the information needs of the academic community. these sections are

 Collection Development division is concerned with acquisition of information resources i n the library.
 Technical services division is concerned with processing of information resource through classification, cataloguing, indexing and abstracting.
 Readers service Division is the public relation units that deal with staff and students registration and controlled the uses of library materials.
 Education and information division take care of General Studies course of library instructions.
 Serial Management division acquires scientific and other materials that are published time to time like newspapers, magazines, journals etc.

List of academic programmes

College of Medicine and Allied Medical Sciences, Federal University Dutse 
Federal University Dutse in its fifth academic calendar have succeeded in establishing College of  Medicine and
Allied Medical Sciences. The faculty runs the following programs:

Bachelor of Medicine, Bachelor of Surgery
Human Anatomy
Human Physiology

Faculty of Agriculture 
FUD currently run six academic programmes in the Faculty of Agriculture

 Department of Agricultural Economics & Extension 
 Department of Animal Science
 Department of Crop Science
 Department of Fisheries and Aquaculture 
 Department of Forestry and Wildlife 
 Department of Soil Science

Faculty of Arts and Social Sciences
FUD currently run four academic programmes in the Faculty of Arts and Social Sciences

 Department of Economics 
 Department of  Linguistics English Language
 Department of Linguistics Arabic 
 Department of Political Science 
 Department of Criminology And Security Studies

Faculty of Management Sciences 
FUD currently run five academic programmes in the Faculty of Management Sciences

 Department of Accounting 
 Department of Actuarial Science 
 Department of Banking and Finance
 Department of Business Administration 
 Department of Taxation

Faculty Of Science 
FUD currently run nine academic programmes in the Faculty of Sciences including basic sciences (Physics, Chemistry, Botany and Mathematics) and applied sciences (Microbiology, Biotechnology, Zoology and Environmental Management and Toxicology)

 Department of Physics
 Department of Chemistry
 Department of Environmental Management & Toxicology
 Department of Mathematics
 Department of Biological Sciences
 Department of Biochemistry
 Department of Microbiology & Biotechnology

Faculty of Computing
Department of Software Engineering
Department of Computer Science
Department of Cyber Security
Department of Information Technology

School of Postgraduate Studies Federal University Dutse
The school of postgraduate was established in 2014/2015 and it runs 10 post graduate Studies. In addition to Msc, Federal University Dutse now offers PhD degree on Biotechnology and Microbiology. Federal University Dutse focuses on building relations with other universities locally and internationally. The university has entered an agreement with North Dakota State University.

Federal University Dutse News
FUD 400 level Mathematics first class student Bashir Muhammad Commits suicide over alleged cheating*
FUD ranks No.1 University in Northwest -NUC 
SCImago ranks FUD No.1 in Mathematics in Africa

References

External links 
Official website
FUD Contact Email

Federal universities of Nigeria
Jigawa State